The United Nations Peace Plaza in Independence, Missouri, was unveiled on October 27, 1997, formally dedicated by U.N. General Secretary Kofi Annan on April 25, 2003, and is described by its creators as "the only memorial in the world to those persons serving in the Peacekeeping Forces of the United Nations". 
The 12.5-foot statue is named "Girl with Dove" by its sculptor, Tom Corbin, and in 2003, a four-foot miniature was gifted to the United Nations Headquarters in New York City.

On December 11, 2006, after his final speech as Secretary-General, delivered at the Truman Presidential Library in Independence, Missouri, Annan visited the Peace Plaza for a wreath-laying ceremony.

References

External links

List of Peace Monuments in central U.S. States: United Nations Peace Plaza "...Near auditorium where President Truman declared the creation of the United Nations. Maintained by Community of Christ (Formerly RLDS Church)..."
U.N. Association marks 60 years of peacekeeping" - Jun 2, 2008 local newspaper report includes photograph of wreath-laying at the site.
"Unique treasure in Independence" - guest columnist James Everett lauds the U.N. Peace Plaza in the Examiner newspaper, February 13, 2009.
Wikimapia Aerial view of the site
"Girl With Dove" replica at a St. Joseph, Missouri public library. (source: "Allied Arts Council" website).
Girl with Dove | Corbin Bronze

Buildings and structures completed in 1997
Buildings and structures in Independence, Missouri
Monuments and memorials in Missouri
United Nations peacekeeping
Temple Lot